Codecasa is an Italian luxury super yacht building firm, founded in Viareggio by Giovanni Battista Codecasa in 1825.

History
The shipyard Codecasa was created by Giovanni Battista Codecasa in 1825.

Today, under the direction of the sixth generation Codecasa, the company works with a custom policy, which aims to build the yacht according to the owner's needs. In January 2020 the Shipyards will launch a new project: the construction of jets 2020. It will be a 70-meter yacht, with a unique design of its kind because it borrows the aviation lines with the result of looking like an airplane resting on the sea. This project should be completed within the year and is destined to become the new flagship of the Codecasa Shipyards.

Even today the company, despite having many employees and several factories, is led at its top by members of the Codecasa family, maintaining a family business identity exactly as it was when it all started. For 40 years now at the helm of the company there has been Fulvio Codecasa (son of Ugo Codecasa), always present in the company, flanked by his daughters Fulvia and Elena Codecasa, and by their respective husbands Ennio Buonomo and Fabio Lofrese.

In 2010, Codecasa launched the superyacht Lady Lau.

Activities

The shipyard is situated in one of the port of Viareggio's oldest docks, covering an area in excess of 6500 square meters. The shipyard is also equipped with repairing and refitting of motor and sailing yachts.

The company is responsible for many luxury yachts around the Mediterranean Sea. Former clients include billionaires such as Mohammed Al-Fayed who bought his yacht the Sokar, originally built in 1990 as the Jonikal, in the spring of 1997. It has a length of  making it the 89th largest yacht in the world in 2007.

Codecasa Yachts was awarded “Best Design” in the large motor yacht category by Yachts Magazine for their 164-foot range of yachts.

Famous yachts
The Invader, 163.7-foot, owned by media mogul Jim Gabbert
The Apogee, 205-foot, owned by Darwin Deason
The Main, 213-foot, owned by Giorgio Armani

See also

 Azimut Yachts
 Baglietto
 Benetti
 Fincantieri
 Rossinavi
 Sanlorenzo
 List of Italian companies

References

External links

Official site
List of Codecasa yachts and pictures

Manufacturing companies established in 1825
Shipbuilding companies of Italy
Yacht building companies
Italian boat builders
Italian companies established in 1825
Italian brands
Companies based in Tuscany
Viareggio